Żory is a town and city county in Silesian Voivodeship, Poland with 62,848 inhabitants (2021). Previously it was in Katowice Voivodeship (1975–1998).

Location 

As of 31 December 2012, the city had a population of 62,052 and an area of 64.64 km².

As of 31 December 2013, the city had 59,960 inhabitants.

On 1 January 2014, the city of Żory increased its area at the expense of Rybnik by 0.26 ha.

Żory borders the counties of Mikołów, Pszczyna and Rybnik, as well as the cities of Jastrzębie-Zdrój and Rybnik.

As of 30 June 2016, the town had a population of 61,942.

Name 
The meaning of the town's name is not clear and there are two theories about it. The first one derives it from Old Polish, from annealing, burning of forests, which was the first stage of establishing a permanent settlement in a given place. This version is related to the primitive economy of burning, which was an element of deforestation of the area for settlement. The topographic description of Upper Silesia from 1865, in turn, derives it from the Polish name of the crane bird (Polish: żuraw). It notes the following passage: "In den verscheidenen Urkunden wird Sohrau einmal Żoraw, dann Żora und auch Sora genannt. Der Name ist polnischen Ursprungs.", that is, in English, "In various documents notated as Żoraw, later Żora, and even Sora. The name is of Polish origin."

In the Latin book Liber fundationis episcopatus Vratislaviensis written in 1295-1305, the town is mentioned as Zary civitate - the town of Zary. The chronicle also lists villages founded under the Polish law iure polonico, which in the course of urbanization were absorbed by the town. These are the present districts or parts of the town Żory as Rogoźna in the fragment "Rogosina in una parte decima solvitur more polonico", Rowień in the fragment "Rovona [Hs. Ronoua.] decima solvitur more polonico", Rój as Ray, Brodek in the fragment "Brodek similiter solvitur decima more polonico."

The Polish name Żory and the German name Sohrau were mentioned by the Silesian writer Józef Lompa in his book Krótki rys jeografii Szląska dla nauki początkowej published in Głogówek in 1847. The geographic dictionary of the Kingdom of Poland published in 1880-1902 lists the town under the Polish name Żary and the German name Sohrau. The Polish name Żary and in the Upper Silesian dialect Żory, as well as the German name Sohrau are also mentioned in 1896 by the Upper Silesian writer, priest Konstanty Damrot, in his book about the local names in Upper Silesia. He also mentions Latinized names noted in Latin documents, such as Sary and Sari. A catalog of coats of arms of German localities, published in 1898 in Frankfurt am Main, identifies the Polish name as Zar.

History

The settlement on the road from Cieszyn to Kraków was first mentioned in a 1258 deed, when it was part of fragmented Piast-ruled Poland. Żory is one of the oldest towns in Silesia, it was granted city rights according to Magdeburg Law on 24 February 1272 by Duke Władysław of Opole. It remained part of the Upper Silesian Duchy of Opole, since 1327 a Bohemian fief, until in 1532 it was incorporated into the Lands of the Bohemian Crown. In 1645 along with the Duchy of Opole and Racibórz it returned to Poland under the House of Vasa, and in 1666 it fell back to Bohemia. In the 18th century, it was centre of cloth manufacturing, later of metal and machining industry.

After the First Silesian War it was annexed by Prussia in 1742, and from 1871 it was part of Germany. In the 18th century, Żory belonged to the tax inspection region of Prudnik. After World War I, in 1918, Poland regained independence, and upon the 1921 Upper Silesia plebiscite, Żory passed to the Second Polish Republic, and was administratively part of the Silesian Voivodeship, though 69.4% of the citizens had voted for Germany.

Żory was the site of a battle between Poles and the invading Germans on the first day of World War II, September 1, 1939. Afterwards it was occupied by Nazi Germany. From 1942 to 1945, the Germans operated a Polenlager forced labour camp for Poles in the city. Among its prisoners were children whose parents were either arrested or deported to Germany. Poles expelled in 1942 from several villages and the town of Szczyrk were also temporarily held in the camp before deportation to forced labour to Germany. In the final stages of the war, in January 1945, the Germans murdered 40 prisoners of the Auschwitz concentration camp in the city during a death march. The city was conquered by Soviet and Czechoslovak troops in March 1945, the German population was expelled, and the city was restored to Poland.

Districts

The town is subdivided into 15 districts.

Śródmieście
Pawlikowskiego
Zachód
Kleszczówka
Powstańców Śląskich
700-lecia
Korfantego
Księcia Władysława
Sikorskiego
Rój
Rogoźna
Baranowice
Osiny
Rowień-Folwarki
Kleszczów

City Council

Environmental protection 
According to a 2016 report by the World Health Organization, Żory was ranked as the 49th most polluted city in the European Union.

Monuments 

According to the National Institute of Cultural Heritage, the following historic buildings are located in the city:
 urban layout
 Gothic parish church of St. Apostles Philip and Jacob from the 15th century
 vicarage from the 19th century
 Evangelical-Augsburg church, 1931
 Evangelical-Augsburg parsonage, 1906
 fragments of a 14th-century fortification wall
 a house, 1 Bramkowa Street, from the 19th century
 the former People's House "Sala Polska", now a community centre, 1 Dolne Przedmieście Street (19th/20th century)
 market square in Żory
 a house, 5 Dolne Przedmieście street, 2nd half of the 19th century
 house, 1 Dworcowa street, 19th century
 complex of houses, 6 Dworcowa street, 1903 (a house, now a music school and a garden)
 low tenement houses built from bricks of the defensive wall in Murarska Street (no.: 11, 13, 19, 35, 37)
 market houses from the 19th century (no.: 1, 12, 23)
 houses on Szeptyckiego Street from the 19th century (no.: 4, 6, 9, 12, 19)
 houses on Szeroka Street from the 19th century (no.: 7, 12, 14, 16, 20)
 St. John Nepomucen statue in the Market Square
 a classicist Żory palace from the turn of the 17th and 18th centuries, in the Baranowice district
 the house at 111 Wodzisławska Street, from the end of the 19th century, in the district of Rogoźna
 a shrine on Rybnicka Street, from the 19th century, in the district of Rowień.

The full list can be found on this article on Polish Wikipedia.

In addition to the objects listed in the register of monuments, other objects of historical importance are also worthy of attention:

 the chapel in Murarska Street
 penitential stone crosses in the old cemetery in Meczenników Oświęcimskich Street and in Rogoźna district on the property in Wodzisławska Street
 Jewish cemetery - 1818

Cycling routes 
There are three cycling routes in the city:

 green cycling route no. 10 – Rybnik – Żory – Suszec
 red cycling route no. 305 – Palowice – Żory
 black cycling route no. 301 – Leszczyny – Żory

Population 

 Total - 61945 (as of 31.12.2015)
 Women - 31589
 Men - 30356
 Unemployment - 8.4% (1545 people, as of December 31, 2015)

Education
Żory offers a full range of educational services, from pre-school forms to university departments. There are 13 public kindergartens and numerous educational institutions, e.g.:
 Karol Miarka Liceum - I Liceum Ogólnokształcące z oddziałami dwujęzycznymi im. Karola Miarki in Żory
 Górnośląska Wyższa Szkoła Handlowa im. Wojciecha Korfantego in Katowice – Branch in Żory (Wydział zamiejscowy w Żorach)
 Silesian University of Technology - Branch in Żory
See the list of educational institutions in Żory on this article on Polish Wikipedia.

Economy 
The average gross monthly salary (2020) in PLN - 4,781.16, or 86.6% of the national average.

At the end of December 2013, the number of registered unemployed in Żory included about 2.0 thousand residents, which is an unemployment rate of 10.9% to the economically active population.

Transport

City transport 
The town has free city transport called Bezpłatna Komunikacja Miejska (BKM), which is organised by the Town Hall in Żory. There are also toll lines of MZK Jastrzębie-Zdrój, ZTZ Rybnik and ZTM, which connect Żory with neighbouring towns.

Road infrastructure 
Through Żory (districts: Rowień-Folwarki and Rój) runs the A1 autostrada, connecting the south with the north of the country. The following roads run through the city:

 A1 autostrada (Gdańsk - Toruń - Łódź - Częstochowa - Gliwice - Żory - Gorzyczki)
 National road 81 (Katowice (A4) - Mikołów - Łaziska Górne - Żory - Skoczów (S52) - Harbutowice)
 Provincial road no. 924 (Kuźnia Nieborowska - Knurów - Czerwionka-Leszczyny - Żory)
 Provincial road no. 932 (Wodzisław Śląski - Świerklany - Żory)
 Provincial road no. 935 (Racibórz - Rybnik - Żory - Pszczyna)

Railroad connections 
The city has direct rail connections to:

 Bielsko-Biała
 Czechowice-Dziedzice
 Gliwice (weekends)
 Kędzierzyn-Koźle
 Kołobrzeg (seasonal)
 Opole
 Pszczyna
 Rybnik
 Świnoujście (seasonal)
 Szczecin Główny (seasonal)
 Wisła (weekends)
 Wodzisław Śląski
 Wrocław Główny
 Kostrzyn nad Odrą (seasonal)
 Zielona Góra (seasonal)

As the neighbouring Jastrzębie-Zdrój is striving to restore the railroad connection, one of the analysed options assumes connecting Jastrzębie-Zdrój with Katowice via Żory and Orzesze.

Technical infrastructure 

 Hotspot on the Market Square.
 Electronic displays at bus stops (BKM) informing about departures and delays.
 Outdoor video screens at busy places around the city.

City bicycles 
In September 2018, GeoVelo urban bike rental service was launched in Żory. In Żory you can use 80 modern unicycles of the so-called fourth generation.

GeoVelo bikes can be rented and returned at 26 locations.

Culture 
The city has a Municipal Cultural Center called Miejski Ośrodek Kultury (MOK) with an auditorium where concerts and theatrical performances are held. Apart from the center, there are also day-care rooms in individual districts of the city where artistic activities take place.

There are two cinemas in the city: Scena "Na Starówce" with one screening room and Helios cinema in Galeria Wiślanka shopping mall with four screening rooms.

In Żory there is the Town Public Library (Miejska Biblioteka Publiczna), which has 7 branches.

The Town Museum (Muzeum Miejskie) is located in the historic Hearinga Villa and has two permanent exhibitions: Nasza toższamość (Our Identity) and Polskie poznawanie świata (Polish Learning about the World). The second museum is the Museum of Fire, located in a building built in 2014 and considered to be an outstanding work of contemporary architecture.

Sport

On March 28, 1920, a nest of the oldest Polish sports organization, the Polish Gymnastic Society "Sokół", was established in Żory. The circle was organizationally subordinate to the VIII Rybnik district of the Silesian district of the Polish Gymnastic Society "Sokól" and belonged to a number of gymnastic sections of the Silesian Sokól. In 1920, the Żory circle of this organization had 39 members.

Clubs 

 Octagon Team Żory (martial arts)
 LKS Jedność Rogoźna (football)
 UKS Salmo Żory (swimming)
 MTS Żory (handball)
 MKS Żory (football)
 LKS Rój Żory (tennis, football)
 Iskra Rowień (football)
 MKS Polaris Żory (football)
 LKS Baranowice (football)
 Gepardy Żory (baseball)
 KS Ogniwo Rogoźna Żory (tennis)
 MOSiR MUKS Sari Żory (volleyball)
 UKS Czwórka Żory (athletics)
 Ks Kleszczów (football)
 MMA Sozo Żory (martial arts)
 Ks Hawajskie Koszule Żory (basketball)
 Grupa Biegowa HRmax Żory (athletics)
 UKS Judo Kontra Żory (judo)
 Żorska Akademia Koszykówki
 Żorska Akademia Talentów Jastrzębski Węgiel

Sport places 

 MOSiR Żory
 OLPN Żory

Orlik 2012 
Currently in żory there are five sports fields built within the framework of the Orlik 2012 program.

Religious communities 
The following religious associations are active in Żory:

Seventh-day Adventist Church:

 in Żory (district: Osiny)

Kościół Chrześcijan Dnia Sobotniego (The Church of the Saturday-Day Christians):

 in Żory

Evangelical Church of the Augsburg Confession in Poland:

 parafia Zbawiciela (parish of the Saviour)

Roman Catholic Church (Żory deanery):

 Parish of St. Apostles Philip and James
 Parish of St. Stanislaus the Bishop and Martyr
 Parish of the Divine Mercy
 Parish of St. Brother Albert in Kleszczówka
 Parish of St. Hedwig of Silesia in Baranowice
 Parish of Our Lady of Czestochowa in Kleszczów
 Parish of St. Joseph the Worker in Osiny
 Parish of the Blessed Virgin Mary Mother of the Church in Rogoźna
 Parish of the Immaculate Heart of the Blessed Virgin Mary in Rowień
 Parish of the Elevation of the Holy Cross in Rój

Kościół Wolnych Chrześcijan (Free Christian Church):

 in Żory

Pentecostal Church in Poland:

 church "Elim" in Żory

Jehovah's Witnesses (Sala królestwa ul. Hańcówka 41)

Notable people
 Otto Stern (1888–1969), physicist and Nobel laureate
 Jerzy Makula (born 1952), pilot, two times European Glider Aerobatic Champion and six times World Glider Aerobatic Champion
 Stanisław Sojka (born 1959), jazz and pop singer-songwriter
 Ewa Swoboda (born 1997), sprinter

Twin towns – sister cities

Żory is twinned with:

 Kamp-Lintfort, Germany
 Mezőkövesd, Hungary
 Pasvalys, Lithuania
 Montceau-les-Mines, France
 Tetiiv, Ukraine

References

External links

 Jewish Community in Żory on Virtual Shtetl

 
Cities and towns in Silesian Voivodeship
City counties of Poland
Socialist planned cities